Guy du Temple de Rougemont (23 April 1935 – 18 August 2021) was a French sculptor and painter. A member of the Académie des Beaux-Arts, he was the son of General .

Biography
De Rougemont studied at the École nationale supérieure des arts décoratifs in Paris, where he studied under Marcel Gromaire. He then stayed at the Casa de Velázquez in Madrid from 1962 to 1964. His first exhibitions took place in 1965 at the Biennale de Paris and the Salon de Mai in 1966.

His sculpting achievements include the Hôpital Saint-Louis, the Marne-la-Vallée–Chessy station, the forecourt of the Musée d'Orsay, the Hakone Open-Air Museum, the Bonn Hofgarten, and the Place Albert-Thomas. He was also a painter, designer, and lithographer.

De Rougemont was the widower of actress Anne-Marie Deschodt, in 2014, with whom he lived in Marsillargues. He died in Montpellier on 18 August 2021 at the age of 86.

References

1935 births
2021 deaths
Painters from Paris
20th-century French sculptors
21st-century French sculptors
20th-century French painters
21st-century French painters